The Bigambul people are an Aboriginal Australian people of the Northern Tablelands and Border Rivers regions of New South Wales and Queensland.

Name
In the traditional language, the name of this group is derived from the Bigambul word biga or pika which translates in English to yes. The Bigambul are bounded to the south–east by the Ngarabal, the Kamilaroi to the south, the Kooma to the west, the Mandandanji and Kabi to the north, and the Baruŋgam to the north–east.

Country

Alternate names

 Bigabul
 Pikambul
 Bigambal
 Bigambel
 Bee-gum-bul
 Bigumble
 Pikumbul,'Pikumpal, Pikambal
 Pikum-bul, Pickum-bul, Pickimbul
 Pickumble, Picumbul, Pikumbil
 Begumble
 Peekumble
 Pickumbil
 Picumbill
 Preagalgh
 Wigal-wollumbul
 Wee-n' gul-la-m' bul

Source:

Clans
The Bigambul have a cultural connection with the northern Kamilaroi people and these people regularly participated in joint ceremonies at Boobera Lagoon.

Language
The Australian Institute for Aboriginal and Torres Strait Islander Studies states that the Bigambul language was used by the Bigambul people, with Gambuwal and Kwiambal (or Gujambal) known dialects.
However, it is more likely that the Gamilaraay (or Yuwaaliyaay) language was used by those peoples living in southern Bigambul territory.

History of contact
The Bigambul people actively opposed European colonisation of their territory. From the early 1840s they mounted a 14–year guerrilla campaign to expel the settlers. The Bigambul leadership understood the importance of economics in warfare and they specifically targeted horses and cattle rather than just the settlers themselves. The campaign was initially successful with 17 selections being abandoned in Macintyre region in 1843, of which only 13 were re-occupied when Europeans returned 3 years later. The economic war was so successful that it is recorded that one selection was making a loss of £150 per year until 1849. The tide of the campaign turned in 1848 when the Governor set aside £1000 to form the Native Police and appointed Frederick Walker to command them. Walker took the battle to the Bigambul, attacking them in their camps with his stated objective being their annihilation. By 1851 the economic war was effectively over, land values in the area doubled and the wages paid by settlers to employees were halved. Most of the work done on selections in the area was performed by Aborigines in return for food rations. By 1854 only 100 of the Bigambul people were left alive.

Native title

Notable Bigambul people
 Chris Sandowa professional rugby league footballer

Notes

Citations

Sources

External links 
 Bibliography of Bigambul people and language resources, at the Australian Institute of Aboriginal and Torres Strait Islander Studies

Aboriginal peoples of New South Wales
Aboriginal peoples of Queensland